The Violin Sonata No. 2 in E major, Op. 102, was written by Camille Saint-Saëns from February to March 1896, and premiered on 2 June 1896 in Paris.

History 

The sonata was composed in Egypt from 17 February to 15 March 1896. It was dedicated to Léon-Alexandre Carembat, who won first prize for violin at the Conservatoire de Paris in 1883 and played for the Orchestre de l'Opéra, and his wife Marie-Louise Adolphi, who won first prize for piano at the Conservatoire in 1883. The couple had given several concerts with Saint-Saëns' works.

The first performance before the official premiere was given by Eugène Ysaÿe and Raoul Pugno on 18 May 1896. The premiere itself, as part of Saint-Saëns' 50th anniversary concert on 2 June 1896 at Salle Pleyel, was given by Pablo de Sarasate and Saint-Saëns for the benefit of the Association des artistes musiciens.

Structure 

The sonata consists of four movements. A performance takes approximately 21 minutes.

Compared to the first violin sonata, which is a brilliant concert piece, the second differs in character. Saint-Saëns himself called it a "very serious chamber work" that "will only be understood after the eighth performance". The sonata signalled a stylistic change in Saint-Saëns' music, with a lighter, clearer sound for the piano, characteristic of his music from then onwards.

Legacy 
As with the first violin sonata, the second sonata was quickly picked up by a number of leading violinists soon after publication.

References

External links 
 

Chamber music by Camille Saint-Saëns
Saint-Saëns
1896 compositions
Compositions in E-flat major
Music with dedications